Südostschweiz (Southeastern Switzerland) is a Swiss German-language daily newspaper, published by Südostschweiz Mediengruppe in Chur, Graubünden.

Profile
The Südostschweiz has the following regional editions:
 since 1997 Regionalausgabe Graubünden (until 1997 Bündner Zeitung)
 since 2000 Regionalausgabe Glarus (until 2000 Glarner Nachrichten)
 since 2006 Regionalausgabe Gaster und See (until 2000 Gasterländer/Seepresse)

The Südostschweiz had a circulation of 138,000 copies in 2003. In 2006 the newspaper had a circulation of 139,802 copies. In 2010 the paper had a circulation of 124,760 copies.

See also
 List of newspapers in Switzerland

References

External links
 suedostschweiz.ch (in German), the newspaper's official website

Year of establishment missing
Daily newspapers published in Switzerland
German-language newspapers published in Switzerland
Mass media in Chur